Hayti is the archaic spelling of the name of the country Haiti, or an archaic name for the island of Hispaniola.

Hayti may also refer to the following places in the United States:
 Hayti, Durham, North Carolina
 Hayti Heights, Missouri
 Hayti, Missouri
 Hayti High School
 Hayti, Pennsylvania
 Hayti, South Dakota

See also
 Haiti (disambiguation)